Dargah Bela is a small village in Vaishali district of Bihar, India. 

Villages in Vaishali district